James Bernard Boudreau  (born July 25, 1944) is a Canadian lawyer and politician.

Provincial politics
Boudreau was elected to the Nova Scotia House of Assembly from Cape Breton The Lakes in the 1988 provincial election. He was re-elected in 1993, and was appointed to the Executive Council of Nova Scotia as Minister of Finance in the Liberal government of John Savage. From 1996, he served as Minister of Health. When Savage resigned in 1997, Boudreau entered the leadership race to succeed him, but was defeated by Russell MacLellan, prompting Boudreau to leave provincial politics.

Federal politics
In October 1999, Prime Minister Jean Chrétien recommended Boudreau for appointment to the Senate of Canada, and to the Cabinet as Leader of the Government in the Senate, replacing Alasdair Graham who had been Nova Scotia's representative in the government since June 1997. It was also announced that Boudreau would be a candidate when the next federal election was held in order to help rebuild the federal Liberals in Nova Scotia, after the party lost all eleven seats in the 1997 federal election.

Prior to the 2000 election, Boudreau was appointed Minister of State for the Atlantic Canada Opportunities Agency. Boudreau resigned from the Senate in order to run in Dartmouth for a seat in the House of Commons of Canada. After a hotly contested campaign, he was defeated by incumbent New Democratic Party Member of Parliament Wendy Lill.

References

External links 
 

1944 births
Living people
Canadian senators from Nova Scotia
Canadian people of Acadian descent
Liberal Party of Canada senators
Members of the 26th Canadian Ministry
Members of the King's Privy Council for Canada
Members of the Executive Council of Nova Scotia
Nova Scotia Liberal Party MLAs
Nova Scotia Ministers of Health
Lawyers in Nova Scotia
People from Sydney, Nova Scotia